USS Mariner was a commercial tugboat operating in the Panama Canal area. When World War I broke out, she was commissioned and armed by the United States Navy, and spent the rest of the war protecting vessels in the vicinity of the canal from German submarines.

Service history
The second ship to be so named by the U.S. Navy, Mariner, a  steam tug, was built at Camden, New Jersey, in 1906. Following America’s entry into World War I, she was taken over by the Navy and commissioned 1 February 1918. She was employed by the Panama Canal Commission during the construction of the Panama Canal and after its completion. Mariner patrolled the approaches to the canal and provided tug and towing services during the remainder of World War I. She was returned to her owner 13 January 1919 and resumed her civilian work. Her name was struck from the Navy list. Mariners ultimate fate is unknown.

References
 
Tug Mariner (1906-19??); USS Mariner (1918-1919).

World War I auxiliary ships of the United States
Tugs of the United States Navy
Ships built in Camden, New Jersey
1906 ships